The O-Zone is a weekly music magazine show broadcast on BBC from 1989 to 2000 made by BBC Children's Presentation. The first series was presented by Andy Crane on BBC One as a ten-minute filler each weekday morning during the summer school holidays, before switching to a Sunday morning slot from that September onwards. The series continued as a five to 15 minute filler shown during school holidays and Sunday mornings on CBBC throughout the year, hosted by CBBC presenters Andi Peters, Philippa Forrester, Toby Anstis and Zoë Ball.

The show was given an overhaul and makeover from 13 January 1995, with Jayne Middlemiss and Jamie Theakston as the new dual presenters. The series was moved to Friday evening with Sunday repeat. The series was extended to 20 minutes from September 1996.

There was also a spin-off series, The Pop Zone shown in 1998.

In October 2000, the show was replaced by Top of the Pops Plus, which had already been on UK Play. That programme was axed in 2001.

References

External links
 
 The O-Zone at the British Film Institute

1989 British television series debuts
2000 British television series endings
1980s British music television series
1990s British music television series
2000s British music television series
BBC Television shows
English-language television shows